The Dubai Women's Sevens is an annual rugby sevens tournament held in Dubai, UAE. The tournament includes several competitions including, since 1994, an international women's invitational competition. Though most entrants are ad hoc sides composed of club and international players from a variety of (generally European) countries, some are official national selections - the results of matches between such sides appear below.

The first Dubai women's sevens competition was held in 1994, where it was won by Kuwait who defeated the Royal Hong Kong Police in the final. Until the 2007 edition was held at the Dubai Exiles Rugby Ground, in 2008 it moved to The Sevens, a new stadium built to host the 2009 Rugby World Cup Sevens. The 2009 competition took place between 3–5 December.

In 2011, a new competition was launched by International Rugby Board (IRB) - the IRB Women's Challenge Cup - as a first step towards a full schedule of IRB-sponsored women's sevens events for 2012–13 season. It featured eight official national teams. The traditional international women's invitational competition also took place on neighbouring pitches.

On 4 October 2012, the IRB announced the launch of the IRB Women's Sevens World Series for the 2012–13 season. The Dubai competition will be the first of four events in the inaugural season.

Results

Earlier winners

2008: 
2009: 
2010: Samurai International RFC
1994:

Dubai Tournament 2006 
No official national selections.

Dubai Tournament 2007 
Played on 1 and 2 December 2007 at Dubai (Source Canada Union). Participants included Canada and USA, but there were no inter-national matches.

Dubai Tournament 2008
Date: 27–29 November 2008.
England played as England Sporting Chance Foundation.  USA did not have this tournament listed as part of their preparation.  Netherlands and Canada are believed to have been near full strength as were the England team. A Kenyan team had entered, but withdrew (Source Netherlands rugby).

Group Games
Sporting Chance Foundation (England) 34-7 USA
Canada 33-5 WOP Netherlands
Semi Final
Sporting Chance Foundation (England) 12-5 Canada
England went on to win the final. USA and Canada were joint third. Netherlands won the plate.
At the same time a "Gulf" competition was played but the results are not included as none of the "nations" has its own union.
Full results

Dubai Tournament 2009
Venue/Date: 4 December 2009, Dubai. As ever the status of some teams is debatable. Possible International match ups are:
Group Games
Georgia 0-54 Arabian Gulf
France 21-12 USA
Kenya 17-21 Arabian Gulf
Georgia 0-41 Kenya
Classification Stages
Kenya 5-26 USA (Plate semi-final)
France finished as champions
Arabian Gulf and Kenya both lost in the Plate semi-finals
USA lost in the Plate final

All results

Dubai Tournament 2010
Venue/Date: 2–3 December 2009, Dubai. As ever the status of some teams is debatable. Fixtures between what appear to be international teams are:
Group Games
France 35 Brazil 0
France 12 Almaty-Kazakhstan 0
Almaty-Kazakhstan 12 Brazil 7
France finished as runners-up (winners Samurai Dubai included several England players).
Kenya and Almaty-Kazakhstan lost in the cup quarter-finals
Brazil finished as runner-up in the Plate (losing to Pink Ba-Baas, composed of English club players).
(Full results)

Dubai Tournament 2011
2–3 December 2011

IRB Women's Sevens Challenge Cup
The first fully sanctioned IRB women's tournament (apart from the 2009 World Cup). Held alongside that year's Dubai Sevens and the normal Women's Invitational, with the semi-finals, the final and all of the Pool A games held on the main pitch. Part of a plan to launch a full IRB International Women's Sevens Series for 2012–13. Selection criteria were not revealed by the IRB, though the teams selected and the seedings roughly reflected the 2009 World Cup rankings - but with China and Brazil invited instead of Spain and France in order to give worldwide representation. Spain were later included when New Zealand declined their invitation to attend.

POOL A

Australia 12-5 Spain
Canada 31-0 Brazil
Australia 40-0 Brazil
Canada 19-14 Spain
Australia 7-14 Canada
Spain 17-0 Brazil
5th to 8th Place
South Africa 19-5 Brazil
Spain 22-14 China
7th Place
Brazil 14-17 China
5th Place
South Africa 0-28 Spain
POOL B

USA 22-10 South Africa
England 26-15 China
USA 14-7 China
England 22-19 South Africa
South Africa 28-14 China
England 31-0 USA
Semi Finals
England 12-10 Australia
Canada 36-0 USA
3rd Place
Australia 22-5 USA
Final
England 7-26 Canada

Women's International Invitational Tournament
This tournament, as usual, featured a mixture of national selections and international invitational teams. The official national teams were France and Kenya in Pool A, and Netherlands and "Maple Leafs" (the Canadian development team) in Pool B. Unofficial teams were Moscow Region and Tuks (South African universities) in Pool A, and Iron Ladies (Ukraine) and Team Globaleye (international team) in Pool B.

Netherlands reach the final, where they beat the Maple Leafs
France were knocked-out in the semi-finals by Maple Leafs
Kenya lost all of their pool games, but finished as runner-up in the plate.

The following are the results of the games involving the official national selections (including the Maple Leafs, though their games are not internationals) - full results can be found here.

Pool games
Netherlands 21-0 Maple Leafs
France 35-0 Kenya
Semi-finals
France 0-12 Maple Leafs
Final
Netherlands 17-5 Maple Leafs

Dubai Tournament 2012

IRB Women's Sevens World Series 

Group A

 5-20 
 19-0 
 22-0 
 0-5 
 5-19 
 17-7 

Group B

 12-15 
 31-0 
 32-0 
 12-12 
 0-27 
 12-12 

Plate Semi Finals (5th-8th)
Canada 24-0 England
Netherlands 5-21 Russia

7th/8th Match 
England 26-5 Netherlands

Plate final: 5th/6th Match 
Canada 10-14 Russia

Group C

 24-12 
 27-12 
 29-0 
 7-12 
 12-14 
 15-7 

Bowl Semi Finals (9th-12th)
France 22-0 Brazil
USA 36-7 China

11th/12th Match 
Brazil 17-19 China

Bowl final:9th/10th Match 
France 12-26 USA

Quarter-finals (1st-8th)
Australia 14-10 Canada
New Zealand 31-0 England
South Africa 12-7 Netherlands
Russia 5-7 Spain

Cup Semi Finals (1st-4th)
Australia 12-24 New Zealand
South Africa 19-17 Spain

3rd/4th place
Australia 5-17 Spain

Cup Final: 1st/2nd place
New Zealand 41-0 South Africa

Women's Invitational Tournament

Maple Leafs 17 - 0 Kenya Lionesses
UAE Women 0 - 7 Moscow Region
Tuks Ladies Rugby 7s 5 - 10 Swedish Vikings 7s
Maple Leafs 36 - 0 UAE Women
Moscow Region 12 - 12 Swedish Vikings 7s
Kenya Lionesses 21 - 0 Tuks Ladies Rugby 7s
Maple Leafs 32 - 0 Moscow Region
Kenya Lionesses 22 - 14 Swedish Vikings 7s
UAE Women 0 - 22 Tuks Ladies Rugby 7s
Maple Leafs 29 - 0 Tuks Ladies Rugby 7s
Kenya Lionesses 7 - 5 Moscow Region
UAE Women 0 - 15 Swedish Vikings 7s
Kenya Lionesses 12 - 5 UAE Women
Maple Leafs 22 - 7 Swedish Vikings 7s
Moscow Region 0 - 12 Tuks Ladies Rugby 7s

Semi-finals
Maple Leafs 31 - 7 Tuks
Kenya Lionesses 7 - 0 Swedish Vikings
Final
Maple Leafs 27-5 Kenya Lionesses

Dubai Tournament 2014

IRB Women's Sevens World Series 

Group A

New Zealand 43-0 China
Russia 12-17 United States
 New Zealand 24-19 United States
 Russia 47-5 China
 United States 61-0 China
 New Zealand 29-12 Russia
Group B

Australia 36-0 South Africa
Spain 0-31 France
Australia 24-10 France
Spain 17-17 South Africa
France 24-7 South Africa
Australia 39-0 Spain

Plate Semi Finals (5th-8th)
Fiji 24-21 United States
England 21-19 Russia

7th/8th Match 
United States 22-20 Russia

Plate final: 5th/6th Match 
England 12-19 Fiji (AET)

Group C

Canada 26-10 Brazil
England 26-0 Fiji
Canada 47-5 Fiji
England 29-7 Brazil
Fiji 21-12 Brazil
England 17-12 Canada

Bowl Semi Finals (9th-12th)
South Africa 17-0 China
Spain 14-19 Brazil

11th/12th Match 
China 5-28 Spain

Bowl final:9th/10th Match 
South Africa 7-17 Brazil

Quarter-finals (1st-8th)
Australia 47-0 Fiji
United States 0-36 Canada
England 5-7 France
New Zealand 19-17 Russia

Cup Semi Finals (1st-4th)
Australia 29-7 Canada
France 10-31 New Zealand

3rd/4th place
Canada 10-5 France (AET)

Cup Final: 1st/2nd place
Australia 17-19 New Zealand

International Invitational 

Group A

Angels 12-19 Almaty
WC Vikings 31-5 Tuks
Almaty 17-7 WC Vikings
Tribe 24-5 Angels
WC Vikings 0-19 Tribe
Tuks 7-27 Almaty
Tribe 34-5 Tuks
Angels 7-22 WC Vikings
Almaty 10-14 Tribe
Tuks 12-22 Angels

Bowl final (9th-10th)
Tuks 24-5 Georgia

Plate Semi Finals (5th-8th)
WC Vikings 5-12 Kenya
Wales 41-0 Angels

Plate final: 5th/6th Match
Wales 29-0 Kenya

Group C

Ireland 12-12 Moscow
Wales 24-12 Kenya
Moscow 24-7 Wales
Georgia 0-48 Ireland
Kenya 7-28 Moscow
Wales 43-7 Georgia
Ireland 33-5 Wales
Georgia 5-25 Kenya
Moscow 38-0 Georgia
Kenya 7-43 Ireland

Cup Semi Finals (1st-4th)
Ireland 24-19 Almaty
Tribe 17-12 Moscow

Cup Final: 1st/2nd place
Tribe 0-19 Ireland

Dubai Tournament 2015

IRB Women's Sevens World Series 

Group A

New Zealand 7-33 Russia
France 25-5 Brazil
New Zealand 36-5 Brazil
France 17-21 Russia
New Zealand 21-12 France
Russia 41-0 Brazil

Group B

Canada 10-24 Fiji
United States 5-12 Ireland
Canada 17-7 Ireland
United States 19-24 Fiji
Canada 35-5 United States
Fiji 27-10 Ireland

Plate Semi Finals (5th-8th)
Spain 12-21 Canada
Fiji 12-33 New Zealand

7th/8th Match 
Spain 14-31 Fiji

Plate final: 5th/6th Match 
Canada 19-24 New Zealand (AET)

Group C

Australia 26-7 Spain
England 35-0 Japan
Australia 43-0 Japan
England 14-7 Spain
Australia 24-7 England
Spain 26-12 Japan

Bowl Semi Finals (9th-12th)
Ireland 7-29 Brazil
Japan 15-14 United States

11th/12th Match 
Ireland 24-31 United States

Bowl final:9th/10th Match 
Brazil 0-13 Japan

Quarter-finals (1st-8th)
Russia 24-0 Spain
Fiji 12-19 France
Australia 15-12 New Zealand
Canada 12-17 England

Cup Semi Finals (1st-4th)
Russia 19-12 England
Australia 26-0 France

3rd/4th place
England 10-5 France (AET)

Cup Final: 1st/2nd place
Russia 12-31 Australia

International Invitational 

Group A

South Africa 7-19 Maple Leafs
Belgium 27-12 Tabusoro Angels Inter
Maple Leafs 41-0 Belgium
Tabusoro Angels Inter 0-28 South Africa
Belgium 0-40 South Africa
Tabusoro Angels Inter 0-48 Maple Leafs

Group B

Wales 33-10 Tuks
France Development 40-0 West Coast Vikings
Tuks 0-59 France Development
West Coast Vikings 0-27 Wales
France Development 38-7 Wales
West Coast Vikings 10-10 Tuks

Bowl semi-finals (9th-12th)
West Coast Vikings 10-7 Tabusoro Angels Inter
Kenya 19-12 Tuks

Bowl final: 9th/10th Match 
Kenya 12-10 West Coast Vikings

Group C

GB Select 33-10 Tokyo Phoenix
Colombia 15-5 Kenya
Tokyo Phoenix 17-12 Colombia
Kenya 7-31 GB Select
Colombia 10-31 GB Select
Kenya 24-29 Tokyo Phoenix

Cup Quarter Finals (1st-8th)
France Development 38-0 Belgium
Wales 5-12 South Africa
GB Select 31-5 Tokyo Phoenix
Colombia 15-26 Maple Leafs

Plate Semi Finals (1st-4th)
Belgium 0-21 Wales
Tokyo Phoenix 7-14 Colombia

7th/8th place
Belgium 17-5 Tokyo Phoenix

Plate Final: 5th/6th place
Wales 31-5 Colombia

Cup Semi Finals (1st-4th)
France Development 17-7 South AFrica
GB Select 24-17 Maple Leafs

3rd/4th place
South Africa 26-19 Maple Leafs

Cup Final: 1st/2nd place
France Development 5-31 GB Select

See also
 Dubai Sevens

References

 
World Rugby Women's Sevens Series tournaments
International rugby union competitions hosted by the United Arab Emirates
Rugby sevens competitions in Asia
Women's rugby union competitions for national teams
1994 establishments in the United Arab Emirates
Rugby union in Dubai
Women's rugby union competitions in Asia
Recurring sporting events established in 1994